The men's coxless pairs event was part of the rowing programme at the 1924 Summer Olympics. The competition, the third appearance of the event, was held from 13 to 17 July 1924 on the river Seine.

Five teams had been entered in the race: The Dutch, the French, the British, the American and the Swiss. However, The American team and the Swiss team did not join the race, so only three teams were left.

The organisation still organised a semi-final. In the first semi-final, the British team rowed against the French team, and the French team won. The Dutch team had a walk-over in their semi-final.
Then, the British team was allowed a rematch. They were the only team, so they won their race and were also in the final. One of the two British rowers was injured however, so they did not start the final.

In the final race between the French and the Dutch, the Dutch took the early lead. Halfway, the French team accelerated, but not fast enough to catch the Dutch team.

Results

Semifinals

Repechage

Final

References

Sources
 
 

Pairs, coxless